Petroglyphs of Lake Onega and the White Sea is a UNESCO World Heritage Site in Russia, Republic of Karelia, listed on 28 July 2021.

The World Heritage Site comprises 33 petroglyph sites in two clusters. The Lake Onega cluster, Pudozhsky District, has 22 petroglyph sites with over 1200 figures. They mostly depict birds, animals, half-human and half-animal figures, as well as geometric shapes possibly representing the moon and the sun. The cluster at the White Sea (Belomorsky District) has 11 sites with over 3400 figures, and according to the Permanent Delegation of the Russian Federation to UNESCO, they are clearly aligned towards hunting and often depicts the hunter himself.

Additionally it also shows sailing boat scenes, as well as hunting and labour equipment, and animal and human footprints. They were created around 6 to 7 millennia ago and represent a glimpse into the lives of Neolithic cultures of Fennoscandia.

References

World Heritage Sites in Russia